Maiwand TV (Persian: تلویزیون میوند) is a television network channel in Kabul, Afghanistan.

See also 
 Television in Afghanistan
 Media of Afghanistan

References

External links 
 Official website/www.maiwandtv.com/en
 www.youtube.com/channel

Television in Afghanistan
Persian-language television stations
Mass media in Kabul